GeneDx is a genetic testing company that was founded in 2000 by two scientists from the National Institutes of Health (NIH), Sherri Bale and John Compton.  They started the company to provide clinical diagnostic services for patients and families with rare and ultra-rare disorders, for which no such commercial testing was available at the time. The company started in the Technology Development Center, a biotech incubator supported by the state of Maryland and Montgomery County, MD. In 2006, BioReference Laboratories acquired GeneDx. Since then, GeneDx has operated as a subsidiary of this parent company under the leadership of Bale (retired in 2016) and Compton (retired in 2013). In October 2016, Benjamin D. Solomon was appointed as managing director.

GeneDx works with the medical, scientific, and patient advocacy communities to continuously develop new genetic tests not currently available at other clinical laboratories. GeneDx currently offers tests for hundreds of rare diseases, as well as panels of genes and whole exome sequencing (20,000 gene) Mendelian disorders using massively-parallel DNA sequencing and deletion/duplication analysis of the associated gene(s). GeneDx also performs oligonucleotide-based microarray testing for the detection of chromosomal abnormalities (genomic losses or gains) in individuals with chromosomal anomalies. GeneDx provides testing for autism spectrum disorders, various forms of cardiomyopathy, inherited eye, skin, muscle, hearing, metabolic, neurologic, and mitochondrial disorders.

GeneDx settled a patent dispute with Myriad Genetics in February 2015 after GeneDx launched a BRCA mutation breast cancer genetic screening test following the US Supreme Court decision in Association for Molecular Pathology v. Myriad Genetics, Inc. that concluded isolated gene sequences were patent ineligible.

References

Genomics
Biotechnology companies of the United States
Companies established in 2000